The timberline sparrow (Spizella breweri taverneri) is a taxonomically controversial American sparrow. Usually treated as a subspecies of Brewer's sparrow, it is considered a distinct species Spizella taverneri by some authorities. While the timberline sparrow recognizably differs in some details, there is little reproductive isolation between the taxa.

When it was still considered a species, it was listed as being of least concern by the IUCN.

Footnotes

References
  (2004): 2004 IUCN Red List of Threatened Species. A Global Species Assessment. IUCN, Gland, Switzerland and Cambridge, UK. 
 

Spizella
Birds described in 1925
Taxonomy articles created by Polbot